Hemoglobin subunit epsilon is a protein that in humans is encoded by the HBE1 gene.

Function 
The epsilon globin gene (HBE) is normally expressed in the embryonic yolk sac: two epsilon chains together with two zeta chains (an alpha-like globin) constitute the embryonic hemoglobin Hb Gower I; two epsilon chains together with two alpha chains form the embryonic Hb Gower II. Both of these embryonic hemoglobins are normally supplanted by fetal, and later, adult hemoglobin. The five beta-like globin genes are found within a 45 kb cluster on chromosome 11 in the following order:  5' - epsilon – gamma-G – gamma-A – delta – beta - 3'.

See also
Hemoglobin
Human β-globin locus
 Hemoglobin alpha chains (two genes, same sequence):
 HBA1
 HBA2

References

Further reading

Hemoglobins